Daniel Fowler Ashford (November 29, 1879 – July 17, 1929) was a cotton planter from St. Joseph in Tensas Parish in northeastern Louisiana, who served from 1916 until his death in office as a Democrat in the Louisiana House of Representatives.

Biography

Ashford was the son of Daniel F. Ashford (1837–1902), M.D., who attended Yale University in New Haven, Connecticut. In 1895, Ashford came to Tensas Parish to manage a plantation for Eli Tullis. He received plantation property thereafter as a wedding gift from his father-in-law, Joseph Moore. Ashford was a stockholder in the Panola Company, an agricultural firm for which Ashford's House successor, Joseph T. Curry of St. Joseph, was the secretary-treasurer. Ashford owned a stable of racing horses and was active in the sportsmen's group, the Cooter Point Club on the Tensas River. Known for his immaculate dress and refined manners, Ashford spent lavishly on himself and his daughters. He is believed to have been the first resident of Tensas Parish to own an automobile and a wristwatch.

Ashford and his wife, the former Margaret "Maggie" Moore (born September 30, 1878), had three daughters, Marie Louise (born 1903), Edith (born 1908), and Margaret Moore (born December 21, 1911). Mrs. Ashford died in Natchez, Mississippi, of acute cardiac arrest on February 27, 1912, at the age of thirty-three, just two months after Margaret's birth. The daughter Margaret never married and lived until January 30, 1980.

Like most of the Tensas Parish planters, Ashford was a member of the Episcopal Church.

Ashford died at the age of forty-nine. He is interred with his wife, youngest daughter, and parents at Natchez City Cemetery in Natchez, Mississippi. In a special election, Joseph T. Curry was elected to succeed Ashford in the House. Curry served from 1930 until 1944.

References

1879 births
1929 deaths
Democratic Party members of the Louisiana House of Representatives
People from Adams County, Mississippi
People from St. Joseph, Louisiana
American planters
Businesspeople from Louisiana
American Episcopalians